Gastrophrynoides is a small genus of microhylid frogs. There are two species known from the Malay Peninsula and Borneo. Common name Borneo narrowmouth toads has been coined for the genus.

Species 
There are two recognized species:

References

 
Microhylidae
Amphibian genera
Amphibians of Asia
Taxa named by Gladwyn Kingsley Noble
Taxonomy articles created by Polbot